Jim Gregory (13 February 1876 – 14 May 1949) was an Australian rules footballer who played with Collingwood in the Victorian Football League (VFL).

Notes

External links 

Jim Gregory's profile at Collingwood Forever

1876 births
1949 deaths
Australian rules footballers from Ballarat
Collingwood Football Club players
Ballarat Football Club players